Black Canary (Dinah Drake) is a superheroine appearing in American comic books published by DC Comics. Created by the writer-artist team of Robert Kanigher and Carmine Infantino, the character debuted in Flash Comics #86 (August 1947) as the first Black Canary in the Golden Age of Comic Books. Strong, mysterious, gutsy and romantic, she has been called "the archetype of the new Film Noir era heroine."

One of DC's earliest super-heroines,  Black Canary, (Wonder Woman. debuted in All Star Comics #8 (cover date Dec/Jan 1941/1942, released in October 1941) has appeared as part of the Justice Society of America. She participated in crime-fighting adventures with her love interest (and eventual husband), Gotham City detective Larry Lance. She and Larry are also the parents of Dinah Laurel Lance, who succeeds the former as the Black Canary in the post-Crisis narratives. In the character's earliest stories, she was introduced as a hand-to-hand fighter without superpowers who often posed as a criminal to infiltrate dangerous gangs. For a number of years following DC's 2011 The New 52 initiative, Black Canary was briefly portrayed as one character, before her mother-and-daughter dynamic was restored to continuity.

A character named Dinah Drake was portrayed by Juliana Harkavy within the Arrowverse mainly the show Arrow. Separately, Alex Kingston portrayed Dinah Lance, Laurel and Sara Lance's mother. Dinah Drake's role as the first Black Canary, who hands on the role to Dinah Laurel Lance is adapted into Sara Lance (Caity Lotz), Laurel's sister.

Publication history
Robert Kanigher and Carmine Infantino created the character in 1947 to be featured in Flash Comics as a supporting character. Appearing first as a clandestine crime-fighter who infiltrates criminal organizations to break them from the inside, Black Canary was drawn with fishnet stockings and a black leather jacket to connote images of a sexualized yet strong female character. She appeared as a character in a back-up story featuring Johnny Thunder:

According to Amash & Nolen-Weathington (2010), Black Canary is "really" Carmine Infantino's "first character." According to the artist:
"When Kanigher gave me the script, I said, 'How do you want me to draw her?' He said, 'What's your fantasy of a good-looking girl? That's what I want.' Isn't that a great line? So that's what I did. I made her strong in character and sexy in form. The funny part is that years later, while in Korea on a National Cartoonists trip, I met a dancer who was the exact image of the Black Canary. And I went out with her for three years.

Bob didn't ask me for a character sketch [for the Black Canary]. He had a lot of respect for me, I must say that. He always trusted my work... Bob loved my Black Canary design."

Fictional character biography

Dinah Drake made her debut in Flash Comics #86 (August 1947) as a supporting character in the "Johnny Thunder" feature, written by Robert Kanigher and drawn by Carmine Infantino. She initially appeared as a villain. Johnny is instantly infatuated with her, and is reproached by his Thunderbolt. Dinah is later revealed to have been infiltrating a criminal gang.

In Flash Comics #92 (February 1948) she has her own anthology feature, "Black Canary", replacing "Johnny Thunder". The new series fleshed out Black Canary's backstory: Dinah Drake was a black-haired florist in love with Larry Lance, a Gotham City Police Department detective. She first meets the Justice Society of America in All Star Comics #38 (December 1947-January 1948), joining them in All Star Comics #41 (June–July 1948). Black Canary's foes include criminal circus act Carno and His Masked Riders, and the Sacred Order of the Crimson Crystal.

Black Canary was revived with the other Golden Age characters during the 1960s. In these stories, it is retroactively established she lives on the parallel world of Earth-2 (home of DC's Golden Age versions of its characters) in Ireland. Married to Larry Lance since the 1950s, Dinah participates in annual team-ups between the Justice Society and Earth-1's Justice League of America.

In a 1969 JLA/JSA team-up against the rogue star-creature Aquarius, who banished Earth-2's inhabitants (except the JSA) to another dimension, Larry Lance is killed saving Dinah's life and Aquarius is defeated. Grief-stricken, Canary moves to Earth-1 and joins the Justice League. She begins a relationship with JLA colleague Green Arrow and discovers that she has developed an ultrasonic scream, the "canary cry."

Black Canary teams with Batman five times in The Brave and the Bold and once with Superman in DC Comics Presents. Appearing frequently as a guest in the "Green Arrow" backup feature of Action Comics, she was a backup feature in World's Finest Comics #244 (April–May 1977) to #256 (April–May 1979) (when the title was in Dollar Comics format). Black Canary's backstory was featured in DC Special Series #10 (April 1978). After the "Black Canary" feature in World's Finest Comics, she appears as a guest in its "Green Arrow" feature and in Detective Comics.

A story in Justice League of America #219-220 (October and November 1983) served to explain the origin of Black Canary's new sonic scream powers, and further, why she continued to appear youthful despite being active since the late 1940s (thereby making her nearly 60 years old). It was established that during the 1950s, she and Larry had a daughter, Dinah Laurel Lance, who was cursed by the Wizard with a devastating sonic scream. Her mother hoped that Johnny Thunder's Thunderbolt could cure her, but the Thunderbolt was only able to keep the younger Dinah in suspended animation in his own dimension. To ease their pain, the Thunderbolt altered the memories of the tragedy, leaving all to believe Dinah's daughter had simply died. Following the battle with Aquarius, Dinah discovered she was dying from radiation exposure, and she asked to see her daughter's grave one last time. Shown the body of her daughter—still in suspended animation, but now grown to adulthood—Dinah wished that she could somehow be her successor. The Superman of Earth-1 and the Thunderbolt conceived a solution and transferred Dinah's memories into her daughter's body so that she could continue fighting as the Black Canary.

A Black Canary miniseries by writer Greg Weisman and artist Mike Sekowsky was planned in 1984. Although its first issue was pencilled, the project was shelved due to the character's use in writer-artist Mike Grell's high-profile Green Arrow: The Longbow Hunters series. Elements of the project were used in Weisman's short film, DC Showcase: Green Arrow.

When DC rebooted its continuity with The New 52, the character was amalgamated with Dinah Laurel Lance, and took the name Dinah Drake. The Golden Age Black Canary was restored to continuity in the lead-up to DC's Infinite Frontier initiative.

Powers and abilities
Dinah Drake is an expert at acrobatics and hand-to-hand combat. She can also train black canaries to do tricks.

In "The New 52" continuity, Dinah Drake possesses an ultrasonic scream.

Equipment
Dinah Drake wears a locket on her neck choker which can release a small knife or a smoke pellet when activated. It also contains other items like an expandable sticky web, sneezing powder, and a converging lens.

Dinah Drake also rides a motorcycle.

Golden Age bibliography
The Black Canary appeared in:
 Flash Comics #86-88, 90-104 (Aug 1947-Feb 1949)
 All Star Comics #38-57 (Jan 1948-March 1951)
 Comic Cavalcade #25 (Feb 1948)

In other media

Television

Live-action
In the 2012 television series Arrow and other series set in its fictional universe, Dinah Lance (presumably Dinah Drake Lance) is the mother of Laurel Lance and Sara Lance as well as the ex-wife of Quentin Larry Lance, she makes occasional appearances in the series, as the character relocated to Central City. She was portrayed by Alex Kingston. 

In its fifth season, Arrow introduces Dinah Drake (Juliana Harkavy) as a new Black Canary. Unrelated to the Lances, she is a former Central City Police Department officer who possesses a metahuman hypersonic cry similar to Black Siren's.

Dinah Drake's role as the first Black Canary, who hands on the role to Dinah Laurel Lance is adapted into Sara Lance (Caity Lotz), Laurel's sister.

Animation
Dinah Drake is the basis of the character Donna Nance, the Black Siren (voiced by Jennifer Hale), in the Justice League episode "Legends".
Dinah Drake appears in flashbacks in Batman: The Brave and the Bold, voiced by Grey DeLisle, depicting her as a founding member of the Justice Society of America and possessing the same "canary cry" as her daughter. She is killed in action when rescuing people from a burning building.
Dinah Drake makes a cameo in DC Super Hero Girls, graduating from Super Hero High.

Film
Dinah Drake is mentioned in the DCEU film Birds of Prey.
Dinah Drake appear in Justice Society: World War II. This version has an ultrasonic scream like "The New 52" version. A tough woman and already a well-known crime fighter she is one of the few recruited into joining the Justice Society. In the team Dinah shares a close friendship with Hawkman. the two seen working together on multiple occasions. Dinah has doubts of the importance of the team as when the war is over they won't get any recognition from it, she also has self doubts in herself questioning her relationship with Police Officer Lance. During the fight in New York Hawkman saves her life from falling but dies in the process. His final words of encouragement are for Dinah to let down her walls and find meaning in love and life. Although in sorrow from losing her friend she avenges him by ripping the monster to shreds with an ultrasonic scream.

See also
Black Canary (comic book)
Woman warrior

References

External links
JSA Fact File: Black Canary I
Earth-2 Black Canary at Mike's Amazing World of Comics

 
Alternative versions of comics characters
Black Canary characters
Characters created by Carmine Infantino
Characters created by Robert Kanigher
Comics characters introduced in 1947
DC Comics female superheroes
DC Comics martial artists
DC Comics metahumans
DC Comics orphans
Earth-Two
Fictional characters who can manipulate sound
Fictional detectives
Fictional female martial artists
Fictional female secret agents and spies
Fictional women soldiers and warriors
Golden Age superheroes
Irish superheroes
Vigilante characters in comics